Donji Dubovik is a village and the center of the municipality of Krupa na Uni, Bosnia and Herzegovina. According to the 2013 census, the village has a population of 215.

Demographics 
According to the 2013 census, its population was 217.

References

Populated places in Krupa na Uni
Villages in Republika Srpska